William Campbell (30 November 1919 – 20 June 1986) was an Irish sports shooter. He competed in the skeet event at the 1972 Summer Olympics.

References

External links
 

1919 births
1986 deaths
Irish male sport shooters
Olympic shooters of Ireland
Shooters at the 1972 Summer Olympics
Place of birth missing
20th-century Irish people